Mogens Jensen (born 31 October 1963) is a Danish politician, who is a member of the Folketing for the Social Democrats political party. He served as the Minister for Food, Agriculture and Fisheries, Minister for Gender Equality, and Minister for Nordic Cooperation from 2019 to November 2020, when he was forced to resign following a botched handling of Cluster 5 resulting in an order to cull the mink population during the COVID-19 pandemic in Denmark.

Political career
Jensen was elected member of Folketinget for the Social Democrats in the 2005 Danish general election. In the government of Prime Minister Helle Thorning-Schmidt, Jensen served as Minister for Trade and Development Cooperation from 2013 until 2014. In response to the introduction of an Ugandan law imposing harsh penalties for homosexuality in 2014, he led Denmark's move to divert 50 million crowns ($9 million) of development aid away from the Ugandan government. Also, under his leadership, Denmark joined the Asian Infrastructure Investment Bank (AIIB) in 2015.

Jensen was appointed Minister for Food, Agriculture and Fisheries, Minister for Gender Equality and Minister for Nordic Cooperation in the Frederiksen Cabinet from 27 June 2019. He saw himself forced to resign as minister on 18 November 2020 due to the mishandling of a case, where – in an attempt to prevent harmful coronavirus mutations in the mink population – the Danish mink fur industry had been ordered by the Danish Veterinary and Food Administration to cull the entire Danish mink population without proper legal provision.

In addition to his role in parliament, Jensen served as member of the Danish delegation to the Parliamentary Assembly of the Council of Europe from 2008 until 2019. He has in the past served as the Assembly's rapporteur on sports governance (2018).

Personal life
Jensen was born in Nykøbing Mors to Harry Jensen and Ebba Møller Jensen. He is openly gay.

References

External links
 

|-

|-

|-

|-

1963 births
Living people
People from Morsø Municipality
Government ministers of Denmark
Social Democrats (Denmark) politicians
Danish LGBT politicians
Danish gay men
Members of the Folketing 2005–2007
Members of the Folketing 2007–2011
Members of the Folketing 2011–2015
Members of the Folketing 2015–2019
Members of the Folketing 2019–2022
Members of the Folketing 2022–2026